The Tokanui River is a river in New Zealand, flowing into Toetoes Bay.

See also
List of rivers of New Zealand

References

Rivers of Southland, New Zealand
Foveaux Strait
Rivers of New Zealand